Liam Higgins (born 27 September 1993) is a New Zealand association footballer who most recently played for English club Staines Town. He made one appearance for the New Zealand national team.

Club career
Higgins began his career in his native New Zealand signing for local ASB Premiership side Team Wellington based out of Dave Farringdon Park before a move to YoungHeart Manawatu followed.

After spending the 2013 season in Australia at Noble Park United, he joined WaiBOP United for the 2013–14 ASB Premiership season.

In 2015, Higgins spent the winter season at Stop Out in the Central League then joined Team Wellington for the 2015–16 ASB Premiership.

Higgins joined Richmond SC in February 2016.

Higgins joined English Non league club Staines Town in 2018 where an ankle injury sidelined him for the season and looked to have prematurely ended his career.

International career
Higgins was first selected to represent New Zealand U20s for the 2011 FIFA U-20 World Cup, held in Colombia. He was also selected for the New Zealand U-20s for the 2013 tournament, held in Turkey.

In 2015 Higgins was selected for both the New Zealand U23, and the New Zealand senior team. U23s coach Anthony Hudson selected Higgins in his U23 squad to compete in the 2015 Pacific Games.

Higgins call-up to the senior team occurred for their friendly against Myanmar on 7 September 2015. He came off the bench in the dying minutes of the second half to record his first senior cap, in a 1–1 draw.

The 2017 season was cut short when an MRI scan discovered a stress fracture in his ankle.

References

External links
 

1993 births
Living people
New Zealand association footballers
Association football defenders
Association footballers from Wellington City
New Zealand international footballers
National Premier Leagues players
YoungHeart Manawatu players
South Springvale SC players
Richmond SC players
WaiBOP United players
Team Wellington players
Stop Out players
Expatriate soccer players in Australia